Brant is an unincorporated community in the town of Chilton, Calumet County, Wisconsin, United States.

History
Brant was established in 1851 under the name of Lynn, with Chauncey Vaughn as its first postmaster. It was renamed Brant in 1856. Brant had a post office as of 1876.

Notable people
Jeremiah Wallace Baldock, Wisconsin State Representative and farmer, lived in Brant.

References

Unincorporated communities in Calumet County, Wisconsin
Unincorporated communities in Wisconsin